Manchester City Football Club is an English professional association football club based in Manchester, that currently plays in the Premier League. The following list covers the period from 1891 (when the club, then known as Ardwick, joined the Football Alliance) to the present day. It details the club's achievements in senior league and cup competitions, and the top scorers for each season. The club was renamed Manchester City F.C. in 1894, and moved to Maine Road in 1923. Since 2003, they have played at the City of Manchester Stadium. Manchester City's biggest rivals are Manchester United; they compete against each other in the Manchester derby. A more recent rivalry with Liverpool has overshadowed the derby in recent years due to both City and Liverpool directly competing for the titles against each other.

Background

Manchester City were formed in 1880 as West Gorton (St. Marks). At this time organised league football did not exist; ordinary matches (that today would be called friendly games) were arranged on a largely ad hoc basis and supplemented by the competitive games that cup competition required. No complete record of the club's matches prior to 1891 survives. In 1890, the club entered the FA Cup for the first time, but withdrew in the second qualifying round. The following season, they joined the Football Alliance and in 1892 were elected to the newly formed Football League Second Division. In 1894, the club restructured, changing its name to Manchester City in the process.

City first reached the highest division of English league football in 1899. Since then City have undergone a further 22 promotions and relegations, though the majority of their history has been spent in the top division of English football. The club has won the League Championship / Premier League eight times, the FA Cup six times, the EFL Cup eight times, the Community Shield / Charity Shield six times, and the European Cup Winners' Cup once for a total of 29 official titles.

In 1970, League Cup and European Cup Winners' Cup victories were both achieved in the same season, making Manchester City only the second English club (Leeds United were the first in 1968) to achieve a domestic cup and European cup double within the same year, and the first English club to do so within the same season. The Blues were also the last team to win the English league championship with a team consisting entirely of players of English nationality (many of whom were also native Mancunians). They are, as of 2022, the only English club to win all major domestic honours in the same season (in 2018–19).

As of the end of the 2021–22 season, Manchester City have played 5,542 competitive matches. In that time the club has spent 93 seasons in the top division of English football, 26 seasons in the second, and one season in the third.

Seasons
Table correct as of 14 March 2023.

Key

Footnotes

References
General

Specific

Seasons
 
Manchester City F.C.